The 2019 CEBL season was the inaugural season of the Canadian Elite Basketball League. It included six teams: Saskatchewan, Fraser Valley, Edmonton, Hamilton, Niagara, and Guelph. The regular season ran from May 9, 2019 to August 15, 2019, and the Championship Weekend took place on August 24 and 25, 2019, hosted in Saskatoon, Saskatchewan. On August 25, the Saskatchewan Rattlers won the CEBL's first ever Championship after beating the Hamilton Honey Badgers.

Regular season

Results

Championship Weekend

Semi-finals

Final

Awards
Source: 
Player of the year: Xavier Moon, Edmonton Stingers
Canadian Player of the Year: Guillaume Boucard, Niagara River Lions
U Sports Developmental Player of the Year: Brody Clarke, Edmonton Stingers
Defensive Player of the Year: Samuel Muldrow, Niagara River Lions
Referee award: David Hersche
Community Ambassadors Awards: Abednego Lufile, Guelph Nighthawks, Jelane Pryce, Saskatchewan Rattlers, Xavier Moon, Edmonton Stingers, Ryan Anderson, Niagara River Lions, Matt Marshall Hamilton Honey Badgers, Marek Klassen Fraser Valley Bandits
Coach of the Year: Victor Raso Niagara River Lions
CEBL Final MVP: Alex Campbell Saskatchewan Rattlers

All-star teams

Statistics

Individual statistic leaders

References

External links 

Canadian Elite Basketball League
2018–19 in Canadian basketball